Rod Taylor (Rodney Sturt Taylor, 1930–2015) was an Australian-born American actor.

Rod or Rodney Taylor may also refer to:
Rod Taylor (American football) (born 1994), American football player
Rod Taylor (singer) (born 1957), reggae singer and producer, born in Jamaica
Rod Taylor (skier) (Roderick G. Taylor, 1943–2014), member of U.S. Olympic Ski Team
Rod Taylor (ice hockey) (born 1967), American ice hockey player
Rodney Taylor (Rodney Graham Taylor, 1940–2002), Chief of the Royal Australian Navy, 1994-1997